Josiah Wear Ellis (born November 16, 1957) is a former American football executive who was the president and CEO of the Denver Broncos of the National Football League (NFL).

College
Ellis received his bachelor's degree from Colorado College in 1980. He attended graduate school at the L. Kellogg School of Management at Northwestern University to obtain his Master's Degree. Joe graduated from Northwestern in 1988.

Career
Ellis began his career in the NFL with the Denver Broncos as their Director of Marketing from 1983 to 1985. After obtaining his master's degree, he served the league as Vice President of Club Administration and Stadium Management until rejoining the Broncos in 1998 as their Executive Vice President of Business Operations. Joe acted in this capacity for 10 years. In 2008, Joe became the team's Chief Operating Officer. He maintained this position for 3 seasons, until January 5, 2011. After 13 years with the organization, he was promoted to team president. 

After owner and previous president Pat Bowlen was diagnosed with Alzheimer's disease, Ellis took control of the team. In August 2022, Ellis stepped down from his position after the Walton Penner group was approved as the new owners of the Broncos.

Personal life
Ellis lives in Colorado, with his wife, Ann. They have three children: two sons, Si and Zander, and a daughter, Catherine. He is also a member of the Bush family through his mother Nancy Walker Bush Ellis, respectively making him the nephew and cousin of former US Presidents George H. W. Bush and George W. Bush.

Awards and honors
Two-time Super Bowl champion (XXXIII, 50) - as an executive with the Denver Broncos
Named ColoradoBiz's CEO of the Year in 2017
Inducted into the Denver and Colorado Tourism Hall of Fame in 2017

References

1958 births
Living people
Bush family
Businesspeople from Colorado
Colorado College alumni
Denver Broncos executives
Kellogg School of Management alumni
National Football League team presidents